Inget Nytt Under Solen is the second album by Swedish Progressive rock band Kaipa, released in 1976. The album title translates to Nothing New Under the Sun.

Track listing

Personnel
Ingemar Bergman: Drums, Temple Blocks, Rattle & Vocals
Tomas Eriksson: Bass, Synth-Bass & Voice Of The Almighty
Hans Lundin: Hammond Organ, Grand Piano, Fender Rhodes Electric Piano, Mellotron, Yamaha & Korg Synthesizers, Logan String Machine, Hohner Clavinet, Vibes, Marimba, Prepared Piano & Lead Vocal
Roine Stolt: Electric Guitar, 6 and 12-String Acoustic Guitar & Rattle
Lars Hoflund: Lead Vocal on Tracks 7, 9 & 10
Kevin Fickling: Interpretation to English tracks 7-10

Bonus Tracks Included On "The Decca Years"

Vocals recorded at "Bastun Studio" Stockholm in October 1977
7. "Awakening/Bitterness" (Kevin Fickling, Hans Lundin) - 6:10
8. "How Might I Say Out Clearly" (Kevin Fickling, Ingemar Bergman, Roine Stolt) - 3:38
9. "The Gate Of Day" (Kevin Fickling, Hans Lundin) - 2:26
10. "Blow Hard All Tradewinds" (Kevin Fickling, Roine Stolt) - 6:18

Bonus Tracks on the Musea release

Same as above plus
11. "Skenet Bedrar" (Live) - 14:08
12. "Fran Det Ena Till Det Andra" - 2:47

Kaipa albums
1976 albums